List of armies — List of French armies in World War I

This page is a list of French army formations existing during World War I.

First Army
Second Army
Third Army
Fourth Army
Fifth Army
Sixth Army
Seventh Army
Eighth Army
Ninth Army
Tenth Army
Army of the Orient (Armée d'Orient)

French armies
 
Armies in World War I